is a railway station in Teine-ku, Sapporo, Hokkaido, Japan, operated by Hokkaido Railway Company (JR Hokkaido). The station is numbered S06.

Lines
Inazumi-Kōen Station is served by the Hakodate Main Line.

Station layout

The station consists of two elevated opposed side platforms serving two tracks. The station has automated ticket machines, automated turnstiles which accept Kitaca, and a "Midori no Madoguchi" staffed ticket office.

Platforms

Adjacent stations

Surrounding area
 Teine Police Station
 Inazumi Teine Post Office
 Teine Inazumi Park
 Teine Swimming Pool

References

External links
 JR Hokkaido station map

Railway stations in Japan opened in 1986
Teine-ku, Sapporo
Railway stations in Sapporo